The Fabulous Joe is a 1947 American comedy film  in the Hal Roach's Streamliners series. It was directed by Harve Foster and written by Arnold Belgard and Jack Jevne. The film stars Walter Abel, Margot Grahame, Marie Wilson, Donald Meek, Sheldon Leonard and Howard Petrie. It was released on October 7, 1947 by United Artists.

Plot

Milo Terkel has been asked for a divorce by his wife Emily and he explains to a judge why, including that it's partially the fault of his dog Joe.

The trouble began one night when Milo bought Emily an expensive piece of jewelry, only to discover she won't be home for dinner. He goes out to eat, taking Joe with him, and the suitably named Gorgeous Gilmore spots the jewelry and admires it.

Jealousy ensues after Emily's freeloading brother George Baxter begins to meddle, making it appear Milo's seeing another woman. Joe the dog doesn't help matters, causing Gorgeous to fall into a pond, causing Milo to take her home and replace her dress. Then the new dress gets ripped from Gorgeous by angry boyfriend Louie.

By the time Milo is done telling how many different ways Joe has intervened and that the dog is even talking to him, the judge is ready to sentence him to a sanitarium. Emily takes pity and takes him away for a fresh start to their marriage instead.

Cast  
 Walter Abel as Milo Terkel
 Margot Grahame as Emily Terkel
 Marie Wilson as Gorgeous Gilmore
 Donald Meek as Henry Cadwallader
 Sheldon Leonard as Louie
 Howard Petrie as George Baxter
 Nana Bryant as Mrs. Belmont
 Clarence Kolb as Cornelius Belmont, II
 John Miles as Cornelius Belmont III (as Johnny Miles)
 Barbara Bates as Debbie Terkel
 Donald MacBride as Lawyer Gilbert
 Lucien Littlefield as Judge
 Dorothy Christy as Grace
 John Eldredge as Charlie
 Al Bridge as Florida Club Bartender

References

External links 
 

1947 films
American black-and-white films
United Artists films
1947 comedy films
American comedy films
Films scored by Heinz Roemheld
1940s English-language films
1940s American films